Star Wars: Path of the Jedi is a guest experience at Disneyland, and formerly located in Disney's Hollywood Studios, Shanghai Disneyland, and Disneyland Paris. It is located in the Tomorrowland (Disneyland), and was located in Tomorrowland (Shanghai Disneyland), Echo Lake (Disney's Hollywood Studios), and Discoveryland (Disneyland Paris) section of the parks. It was a montage of assorted scenes from all of the Star Wars films, shown thematically rather than chronologically. When it first opened, it just featured scenes from the first six films. However, before each subsequent film was released a sneak preview was added, which led to scenes from that film being added to the main film.

Disney's Hollywood Studios  
The attraction opened on July 4, 2014, in the Echo Lake section of the park. It was presented in the ABC Sound Studio, the former home of Sounds Dangerous!, which is replaced. Its run was often interrupted by previews for then current or upcoming Disney movies. After many updates, and a seasonal run for a year, the attraction was permanently closed on December 31, 2018. It was replaced by Mickey Shorts Theater, which redecorated the theater and seats with a Mickey Mouse theme. The theater had not been redecorated for the Path of the Jedi, and until this point retained the theming from Sounds Dangerous, which was very similar to the original theme of the theater. It opened on March 4, 2020, alongside the headliner attraction, Mickey & Minnie's Runaway Railway, and featured a short about Mickey and Minnie going on vacation.

Disneyland  
The attraction opened on April 17, 2015, replacing Captain EO. Captain EO was only supposed to have a temporary run, after the death of Michael Jackson, but it lasted over four years until being replaced in mid 2014. Similar to the Hollywood Studios version, its run was also interrupted multiple times to show previews for Disney movies. However, this occurred less often than in Hollywood Studios due to the availability of more theaters to show previews in at the Disneyland Resort. The attraction was closed in May 28, 2018 and was reopened in March 5, 2019. The attraction was closed again on March 14, 2020 with the rest of the park. The attraction did not re-open with the rest of the park on April 30, 2021, and its queue was replaced by a seating area.

References 

Closed amusement attractions
Disneyland
Disneyland Park (Paris)
Disney's Hollywood Studios
Shanghai Disneyland
Tomorrowland
Echo Lake (Disney)
2015 establishments in California
2015 establishments in Florida
2019 disestablishments in Florida
2016 establishments in China
2019 disestablishments in China
2017 establishments in France
2018 disestablishments in France
Attractions based on Star Wars